Zabrus corpulentus is a species of ground beetle in the Pelor subgenus that can be found in Bulgaria and Near East.

Subspecies
There are three subspecies of Z. corpulentus:
 Z. corpulentus armeniacus  Ganglbauer, 1915
 Z. corpulentus corpulentus Schaum, 1864
 Z. corpulentus ponticus  Ganglbauer, 1915

References

Beetles described in 1864
Beetles of Asia
Beetles of Europe
Zabrus
Taxa named by Hermann Rudolph Schaum